The Art Libraries Society of North America (also known as ARLIS/NA) was founded in 1972.  It is an organization made up of approximately 1,000 art librarians, library students and visual resource professionals.

Activities
ARLIS/NA organizes activities such as:
 annual conferences,
 publishing articles through publications such as Art Documentation, occasional papers, and online publications,
 providing a forum for professional communication, via listserv and a web site,
 scholarship awards,
 awards for research, service, and publication.

History
Before ARLIS/NA, art librarians organized under an American Library Association Round Table. However, ALA support was limited. Meetings were only held biannually, attendance was minimal, and professional progress slow. During the post-war years the world had opened up, and through the influence of popular magazines like Time and Life, Americans were exposed to a range of cultures. According to Wolfgang Freitag, "Hundreds of new museums and libraries were built every year ... there was an explosion of publications in the traditional formats on all subjects." All of these developments led to the very real need for art librarians to organize.

By the late 1960s, against ALA's wishes, a separate, short-lived art libraries group was created in conjunction with an existing museum sub-section of the Association of College and Research Libraries (ACRL), a division of ALA. This proved to be temporary, too, as support was again limited. According to William J. Dane, "We didn't like being called a sub-section. We didn't need to depend on ALA or ACRL. There were enough of us who said, 'The hell with you.' Once the idea of independence got going, it was irreversible." ARLIS/NA was founded in 1972 by art librarians attending the American Library Association annual conference in Chicago and was the brainchild of Judith Hoffberg, who had been inspired by attending meetings of ARLIS/UK in London. The informal annual meetings of art librarians with College Art Association furthered the initiative to organize. According to Wolfgang Freitag, "The Association of College and Research Libraries was but one of several library organizations in which art librarians were enrolled at that time."

By 1982 a major section of ARLIS/NA had broken off to form its own group, Visual Resources Association (VRA). The mission of the VRA is focused on media and image management, as well as progressing research and education in those areas. Wolfgang Freitag said "The growth of the two organizations has strengthened the profession as a whole so that it is stronger today than we could have imagined thirty and twenty years ago. It is a consolation that this happened even though, or perhaps because, the two main branches of what to my mind is still an indivisible profession gained their strength by following different paths and by marching to different drummers."

The ARLIS/NA membership has, from its beginnings, included librarians, archivists, visual resource  professionals, artists, curators, educators, publishers, as well as students and others interested in visual arts information.  They work in many art and architecture venues, large and small, throughout North America: art museums, colleges and universities, art and design schools, public libraries, and corporate offices.  Annual conferences and publications, as well as listserv threads feature discussions, presentations, workshops, and other opportunities for specialized professional development interests, such as cataloging, public services, archives, and acquisitions as well as technological trends and social issues of interest to the membership as a whole.  Virtual sessions are common, especially since travel was limited during the 2020 COVID-19 global pandemic.  For the first time in 48 years, the annual conference, scheduled to meet in 2020 in St. Louis, was cancelled; however some virtual programs, originally planned for St. Louis, were produced instead.

Chapters
ARLIS/NA is an international organization with regional affiliated chapters across Canada, Mexico, and the United States. Two chapters, ARLIS/NA Texas-Mexico and ARLIS/NA Northwest, are transnational. ARLIS/NA also as a Canadian chapter.

Affiliates 
ARLIS/NA has relationships with many affiliated organizations across the arts, librarianship, and visual resources management, including the American Library Association, ARLIS/UK & Ireland, the College Art Association, and REDARTE/RJ.

Organizational structure
The ARLIS/NA Executive Board is composed of a president, vice-president/president-elect and past president, all of whom serve a continuous three-year term; and a secretary, treasurer, chapters liaison, Canadian liaison, advancement liaison, education liaison, and an editorial director, all of whom serve two-year terms. The ARLIS/NA Executive Director also serves on the ARLIS/NA Board.

Past presidents

Annual conferences
ARLIS/NA hosts a yearly conference for members to meet in person, share ideas and network.

2023 - 51st Annual - Mexico City, México
2022 - 50th Annual - Chicago, Illinois
2021 - 49th Annual - Montreal, Quebec (virtual due to COVID-19 pandemic)
2020 - 48th Annual - St. Louis, Missouri (canceled due to health threat of COVID-19 pandemic) 
2019 - 47th Annual - Salt Lake City, Utah
2018 - 46th Annual - New York City, New York
2017 - 45th Annual - New Orleans, Louisiana
2016 - 44th Annual - Seattle, Washington (joint with Visual Resources Association)
2015 - 43rd Annual - Fort Worth, Texas
2014 - 42nd Annual - Washington, D.C.
2013 - 41st Annual - Pasadena, California
2012 - 40th Annual - Toronto, Ontario
2011 - 39th Annual - Minneapolis, Minnesota (joint with Visual Resources Association)
2010 - 38th Annual - Boston, Massachusetts
2009 - 37th Annual - Indianapolis, Indiana
2008 - 36th Annual - Denver, Colorado
2007 - 35th Annual - Atlanta, Georgia
2006 - 34th Annual - Banff, Alberta, Canada
2005 - 33rd Annual - Houston, Texas
2004 - 32nd Annual - New York City, New York
2003 - 31st Annual - Baltimore, Maryland
2002 - 30th Annual - St. Louis, Missouri (joint with Visual Resources Association)
2001 - 29th Annual - Los Angeles, California
2000 - 28th Annual - Pittsburgh, Pennsylvania
1999 - 27th Annual - Vancouver, British Columbia
1998 - 26th Annual - Philadelphia, Pennsylvania
1997 - 25th Annual - San Antonio, Texas
1996 - 24th Annual - Miami Beach, Florida
1995 - 23rd Annual - Montreal, Quebec
1994 - 22nd Annual - Providence, Rhode Island
1993 - 21st Annual - San Francisco, California
1992 - 20th Annual - Chicago, Illinois
1991 - 19th Annual - Kansas City, Kansas
1990 - 18th Annual - New York City, New York
1989 - 17th Annual - Phoenix, Arizona
1988 - 16th Annual - Dallas, Texas
1987 - 15th Annual - Washington, D.C.
1986 - 14th Annual - New York City, New York
1985 - 13th Annual - Los Angeles, California
1984 - 12th Annual - Cleveland, Ohio
1983 - 11th Annual - Philadelphia, Pennsylvania
1982 - 10th Annual - Boston, Massachusetts
1981 - 9th Annual - San Francisco, California
1980 - 8th Annual - New Orleans, Louisiana
1979 - 7th Annual - Toronto, Ontario
1978 - 6th Annual - New York City, New York
1977 - 5th Annual - Los Angeles, California
1976 - 4th Annual - Chicago, Illinois
1975 - 3rd Annual - Washington, D.C.
1974 - 2nd Annual - Detroit, Michigan
1973 - 1st Annual - New York City, New York

Awards and honors
ARLIS/NA offers travel awards to students and industry professionals (members and non-members) to their annual conferences.

Distinguished Service Award

One of the honors is the Distinguished Service Award which is given to an individual of any country whose exemplary service in art librarianship, visual resources curatorship, or a related field, has made an outstanding national or international contribution to art information.

The George Wittenborn Memorial Book Award
Since its foundation in 1974, ARLIS/NA has bestowed the George Wittenborn Memorial Book Award annually.  This honor recognizes excellence of content and production in North American art publications. Initially called the Art Publishing Award, it was renamed in 1980 to honor George Wittenborn (1905–1974), the influential New York art book dealer and publisher. The award is presented annually for outstanding publications in the visual arts and architecture which combine the highest standards of scholarship, design, and production.

Outreach/communications
ARLIS-L is the society's listserv which functions as a forum for sharing information and discussing issues facing art librarians, library students and visual resource professionals.  The listserv is also a resource for job listings.  ARLIS-L is a place for society members to distribute information about ARLIS/NA activities at conferences, workshops and meetings, announcements of awards and honors, news regarding society members and information on new print and electronic publications. ARLIS-L is an open discussion list and anyone may subscribe.

Publications

Art Documentation
Art Documentation is the official journal of the Art Libraries Society of North America and is published twice yearly by the University of Chicago Press.  Art Documentation includes articles and information relevant to art librarianship and visual resources curatorship.  The publication includes practical information for the ARLIS/NA community such as committee, conference, meeting, chapter and member updates.

Occasional papers
Manuscripts for purchase on art information issues with such topics on staffing standards and core competencies.

Online publications
Resources are available for download on the ARLIS/NA website.

See also
Art history
Art Libraries Society - U.K. and Ireland equivalent
Judith Hoffberg
List of library associations
Slide library
Special Libraries Association (SLA)

References

External links
Art Documentation
Archives of ARLIS/NA at the University of Illinois

Library associations